Glanshammar is a locality situated in Örebro Municipality, Örebro County, Sweden with 727 inhabitants in 2010.

Riksdag elections

References 

Populated places in Örebro Municipality